Bruinsburg is a ghost town in Claiborne County, Mississippi, United States.

The town's port, Bruinsburg Landing, was located directly on the Mississippi River, just south of the mouth of the Bayou Pierre.

Once an important commercial and military location, nothing remains today of the town or its port.

History
Bruinsburg is named for Peter Bryan Bruin, who emigrated from Ireland to Virginia in 1756, and later fought as a lieutenant during the American Revolution.  Following the war, Bruin's father received  of land in Mississippi in a grant from Don Diego de Gardoqui, a Spanish minister who controlled the region.  Peter Bruin's family, along with 12 other families, moved there in 1778.

The land grant required the settlers to survey the land, clear trees, build cabins, and plant crops.  The settlers were soon growing corn, cotton, tobacco, indigo, fruits and vegetables.

After the southern United States became an American possession, Bruin was appointed a judge.  In 1807, former Vice-President Aaron Burr, who at the time was wanted on a charge of treason, visited Bruin while fleeing federal agents.

Lake Bruin, an oxbow lake in Louisiana west of Bruinsburg, is named for Peter Bruin.

The community was a lively Mississippi River port, and future U.S. President Andrew Jackson set up a trading post there for a time.

Civil War
Union Army General Ulysses S. Grant was planning a massive assault on the Confederate stronghold of Vicksburg, Mississippi.

The following day, 17,000 Union soldiers began landing at Bruinsburg, marking the beginning of the Battle of Port Gibson, part of the larger Vicksburg Campaign.  Because river traffic had diminished through the war, when the soldiers arrived at Bruinsburg the port was nearly deserted, and the sole witness to the invasion was a farmer who appeared too confused to flee.  The port proved to have a good solid bank, and space for many boats.  It was the largest amphibious operation in American military history until the Allied invasion of Normandy.

The soldiers moved east along the dusty wagon trails from Bruinsburg, and then rested under the trees of the nearby Windsor Plantation.  That evening, they began their march north.

By 1865 the town was extinct.

The former town and its landing are now located on private property.  A historic plaque commemorating Bruinsburg is located on Church Street in Port Gibson.

References

Former populated places in Claiborne County, Mississippi
Former populated places in Mississippi
Mississippi populated places on the Mississippi River
Mississippi in the American Civil War